The Fokker F.II was the first of a long series of commercial aircraft from the Fokker Aircraft Company, flying in 1919. In a biplane age, it presented a distinct clean, high-wing monoplane style that sold successfully across Europe and North America during the development of commercial passenger-carrying aviation.

Design and development
The Fokker F.II was a single engined high-wing cantilever monoplane with a design lineage that went back to designer Reinhold Platz's Dr.I triplane, via the biplane D.VII and monoplane D.VIII fighters and his unflown F.I civil design. The Dr.I was the first aircraft  to use the thick high lift/drag airfoils that enabled high climb rates and also allowed internal wing bracing. Hence the triplane wing needed no external wire bracing and its monoplane successors, apart from attachments to the fuselage were simple cantilever structures.

The F.II had other characteristic early-Fokker design features: a wing constructed of wood, fully skinned in plywood, with ailerons extending beyond the wingtips and a deep sided square section fuselage of welded steel tube covered in fabric which provided enough directional stability that no vertical fin was fitted. The F.II had a fixed undercarriage, the main units of which were joined by a cross-axle.

There was enclosed accommodation for four passengers; a fifth could travel alongside the pilot in his unenclosed cockpit, in a seat originally intended for a mechanic or navigator.
   
The prototype F.II, known by the company designation V.45, was constructed at the Fokker factory in Schwerin, Germany, and made its first flight there in October 1919. When Anthony Fokker decided to relocate the firm to the Netherlands, the V.45 was illegally flown across the border on 20 March 1920. Even after this, perhaps another three examples were built at Schwerin before production shifted to Veere. All F.IIs built by Fokker had the 138 kW (185 hp) BMW IIIa engine. The Dutch airline KLM, which ordered the first two F.IIs after the prototype, found the BMW IIIa lacked power and had cooling problems. After an experiment with a 133 kW (178 hp) Mercedes motor, KLM re-engined both of their aircraft with the 179 kW (240 hp) Armstrong Siddeley Puma.

In Germany, however, the technical manager of Deutsche Aero Lloyd, Karl Grulich, arranged to build the type under licence for the airline, making a few modifications of his own to the design. These included strengthened landing gear, a redesigned cockpit, and redesigned trapezoidal cabin windows. At least 20, the great majority of F.IIs, were assembled by Deutsche Aero Lloyd at Staaken, Berlin. They built the fuselages there, but the wings were built by Albatros and were then supplied to the airline for final assembly. These rather heavier aircraft were powered by 172 kW (230 hp) BMW IV (and later 239 kW/320 hp BMW Va) motors.

Operational history
KLM operated two F.IIs between 1920 and 1927, which were then sold to SABENA who used them on their Brussels-Antwerp route. The machines that Fokker had built in Germany were bought by Deutsche Luftreederei and registered in the Free City of Danzig. Deutsche Aero Lloyds aircraft were used right up until the time the airline was absorbed by Deutsche Luft Hansa in 1926, at which point ten machines remained. These were put to use on regional routes linking Cologne with Aachen, Essen, Krefeld, and Mülheim until 1934.

Operators

 SABENA
 Free City of Danzig
 Deutsche Luft-Reederei

 Deutsche Aero Lloyd
 Deutsche Luft Hansa

 KLM

Specifications (Puma powered)

References

Bibliography

Anderson, J. D. A History of Aerodynamics (1997). Cambridge University Press. 
de Leeuw, R. Fokker Commercial Aircraft (1994). Fokker Publications

 
 
 
 

1910s German airliners
F 02
Aircraft first flown in 1919
High-wing aircraft